Ted Wood (5 April 1916 – 12 September 1995) was a former Australian rules footballer who played with Melbourne in the Victorian Football League (VFL).

Notes

External links 

1916 births
Australian rules footballers from Victoria (Australia)
Melbourne Football Club players
Preston Football Club (VFA) players
1995 deaths